Arturo Calabresi (17 March 1996) is an Italian professional footballer who plays as a centre back for  club Pisa.

Club career

Roma 
Calabresi is a product of A.S. Roma's youth academy where he played since 2007. On 24 July 2014, Calabresi made his unofficial debut for Roma in a friendly match, as a substitute replacing Ashley Cole in the 62nd minute of a 1–0 win over Liverpool.

Loan to Livorno 
In the summer of 2015 he was loaned to Livorno in Serie B on a 6-month loan deal. On 8 August, Calabresi made his debut for Livorno as a substitute replacing Federico Ceccherini in the 66th minute of the second round of Coppa Italia in a match won 2–0, after extra-time, against Ancona. On 16 August he played in the third round of Coppa Italia, where he was replaced by Federico Ceccherini in the 104th minute of a match lost 2–0, after extra-time, against Carpi. Calabresi made his Serie B debut on 12 September in a 2–1 away win over Como. On 18 September he scored his first professional goal in the 68th minute of a 3–1 home win over Brescia. Calabresi finished his loan at Livorno with 12 appearances and 1 goal.

Loan to Brescia 
At mid season, during the January 2016 transfer window, Calabresi was sent on loan again, this time to Brescia in Serie B on an 18-month loan deal, with an option to buy. On 6 February, Calabresi made his debut for Brescia in Serie B in a 2–1 away defeat against Pro Vercelli. On 11 April he scored his first goal for Brescia in the 94th minute of a 2–2 home draw against Perugia. On 9 May he received a red card in the 66th minute of a 2–1 away defeat against Spezia. Calabresi ended his second part of the season with Brescia with 14 appearances, 1 goal and 1 assist.

Calabresi played his first match of the season on 7 August in the second round of Coppa Italia in a 2–0 home defeat against Pisa. On 27 August he played his first Serie B match of the season, a 1–1 away draw against Avellino. On 21 January 2017, he was sent off for two yellow cards in the 65th minute of a 2–0 home defeat against Avellino. Calabresi ended his loan with Brescia with 31 appearances, in total he made 44 appearances, 1 goal and 1 assist for Brescia.

Loan to Spezia and Foggia 
On 7 July 2018, Calabresi was signed by Serie B side Spezia on a season-long loan deal. On 19 September he made his debut for Spezia as a substitute replacing Luca Vignali in the 60th minute of a 1–0 home win against Novara. On 23 September, Calabresi played his first match as a starter, a 2–0 away defeat against Salernitana. In January 2018, Calabresi was re-called to Roma leaving Spezia with only 2 appearances.

On 23 January 2018, he moved to Serie B club Foggia on a six-month loan deal.

Bologna and loan to Cagliari 
On 21 June 2018, Bologna confirmed the signing of Calabresi from Roma for an undisclosed fee.

On 22 January 2021 he joined Cagliari on loan.

Lecce 
On 29 July 2021 he joined Lecce on a permanent basis.

Pisa
On 11 August 2022, Calabresi signed a three-year contract with Pisa.

International career 
With the Italy U17 side he took part at the 2013 UEFA European Under-17 Championship and at the 2013 FIFA U-17 World Cup.

On 12 August 2015, he made his debut with the Italy U21 team, as a substitute replacing Francesco Vicari in the 46th minute in a friendly match against Hungary.

Personal life 
He is the son of Italian actor and television personality Paolo Calabresi; as a kid, he also made a short appearance in 2010 in an episode of the TV series Boris as the son of the character played by his father.

Career statistics

Club

References

Living people
1996 births
Footballers from Rome
Italian footballers
Italy under-21 international footballers
Italy youth international footballers
Association football defenders
A.S. Roma players
U.S. Livorno 1915 players
Brescia Calcio players
Spezia Calcio players
Calcio Foggia 1920 players
Bologna F.C. 1909 players
Amiens SC players
Cagliari Calcio players
Pisa S.C. players
Serie A players
Serie B players
Ligue 1 players
Italian expatriate footballers
Expatriate footballers in France
Italian expatriate sportspeople in France